Randolph Denard Ornette Coleman (March 9, 1930 – June 11, 2015) was an American jazz saxophonist, trumpeter, violinist, and composer. He was best known as a principal founder of the free jazz genre, a term derived from his 1960 album Free Jazz: A Collective Improvisation. His pioneering works often abandoned the harmony-based composition, tonality, chord changes, and fixed rhythm found in earlier jazz idioms. Instead, Coleman emphasized an experimental approach to improvisation, rooted in ensemble playing and blues phrasing. AllMusic called him "one of the most beloved and polarizing figures in jazz history," noting that while "now celebrated as a fearless innovator and a genius, he was initially regarded by peers and critics as rebellious, disruptive, and even a fraud."

Born and raised in Fort Worth, Texas, Coleman taught himself to play the saxophone when he was a teenager. He began his musical career playing in local R&B and bebop groups, and eventually formed his own group in Los Angeles featuring members such as Ed Blackwell, Don Cherry, Charlie Haden, and Billy Higgins. In November 1959, his quartet began a controversial residency at the Five Spot jazz club in New York City and he released the influential album The Shape of Jazz to Come, his debut LP on Atlantic Records. Coleman's subsequent Atlantic releases in the early 1960s would profoundly influence the direction of jazz in that decade, and his compositions "Lonely Woman" and "Broadway Blues" became genre standards that are cited as important early works in free jazz.

In the mid 1960s, Coleman left Atlantic for labels such as Blue Note and Columbia Records, and began performing with his young son Denardo Coleman on drums. He explored symphonic compositions with his 1972 album Skies of America, featuring the London Symphony Orchestra. In the mid-1970s, he formed the group Prime Time and explored electric jazz-funk and his concept of harmolodic music. In 1995, Coleman and his son Denardo founded the Harmolodic record label. His 2006 album Sound Grammar received the Pulitzer Prize for Music, making Coleman the second jazz musician ever to receive the honor.

Biography

Early life 
Coleman was born on March 9, 1930, in Fort Worth, Texas, where he was raised.

He attended I.M. Terrell High School, where he participated in band until he was dismissed for improvising during "The Washington Post" march. He began performing R&B and bebop on tenor saxophone and started The Jam Jivers with Prince Lasha and Charles Moffett.

Eager to leave town, he accepted a job in 1949 with a Silas Green from New Orleans traveling show and then with touring rhythm and blues shows. After a show in Baton Rouge, Louisiana, he was assaulted and his saxophone was destroyed.

He switched to alto saxophone, which remained his primary instrument, first playing it in New Orleans after the Baton Rouge incident. He then joined the band of Pee Wee Crayton and traveled with them to Los Angeles. He worked at various jobs, including as an elevator operator, while pursuing his music career.

In California he found like-minded musicians such as Ed Blackwell, Bobby Bradford, Don Cherry, Charlie Haden, Billy Higgins, and Charles Moffett. He recorded his debut album, Something Else!!!! (1958), with Cherry, Higgins, Walter Norris, and Don Payne. During the same year he belonged briefly to a quintet led by Paul Bley that performed at a club in New York City. By the time Tomorrow Is the Question! was recorded soon after with Cherry, Higgins, and Haden, the jazz world had been shaken up by Coleman's alien music. Some jazz musicians called him a fraud, while conductor Leonard Bernstein praised him.

1959: The Shape of Jazz to Come 
In 1959 Atlantic released The Shape of Jazz to Come. According to music critic Steve Huey, the album "was a watershed event in the genesis of avant-garde jazz, profoundly steering its future course and throwing down a gauntlet that some still haven't come to grips with." Jazzwise listed it No. 3 on their list of the 100 best jazz albums of all time.  When French philosopher Jacques Derrida interviewed him, Ornette said that "Lonely Woman" from the album resulted from seeing a rich woman who was in such solitude.

Coleman's quartet received a long – and sometimes controversial – engagement at Five Spot jazz club in New York City. Leonard Bernstein, Lionel Hampton, and the Modern Jazz Quartet were impressed and offered encouragement. Hampton asked to perform with the quartet; Bernstein helped Haden obtain a composition grant from the John Simon Guggenheim Memorial Foundation. But trumpeter Miles Davis said Coleman was "all screwed up inside", although he later became a proponent of Coleman's innovations.

Coleman's early sound was due in part to his use of a plastic saxophone. He bought a plastic horn in Los Angeles in 1954 because he was unable to afford a metal saxophone, though he didn't like the sound of the plastic instrument at first.

On the Atlantic recordings, Coleman's sidemen in the quartet are Cherry on cornet or pocket trumpet; Charlie Haden, Scott LaFaro, and then Jimmy Garrison on bass; and Higgins or his replacement Ed Blackwell on drums. The complete recordings for the label were collected on the box set Beauty Is a Rare Thing.

1960s: Free Jazz and Blue Note
In 1960, Coleman recorded Free Jazz: A Collective Improvisation, which featured a double quartet, including Don Cherry and Freddie Hubbard on trumpet, Eric Dolphy on bass clarinet, Haden and LaFaro on bass, and both Higgins and Blackwell on drums. The album was recorded in stereo with a reed/brass/bass/drums quartet isolated in each stereo channel. Free Jazz was, at 37 minutes, the longest recorded continuous jazz performance to date and was one of Coleman's most controversial albums. The music features a regular but complex pulse, one drummer playing "straight" while the other played double-time; the thematic material is a series of brief, dissonant fanfares. A series of solo features for each member of the band, but the other soloists are free to chime in as they wish. In the January 18, 1962, issue of Down Beat magazine, in a review titled "Double View of a Double Quartet", Pete Welding gave the album five stars while John A. Tynan rated it zero stars. Time has been kinder to the album, though, with AllMusic listing it as one of "20 Essential Free Jazz albums".

Coleman intended "free jazz" as simply an album title. But his growing reputation placed him at the forefront of jazz innovation, and free jazz was soon considered a new genre, though Coleman has expressed discomfort with the term. Among the reasons he may have disapproved of the term is that his music contains composition. His melodic material, although skeletal, recalls melodies that Charlie Parker wrote over standard harmonies. The music is closer to the bebop that came before it than is sometimes popularly imagined.

After the Atlantic period and into the early part of the 1960s, Coleman's music became more angular and engaged with the avant-garde jazz which had developed in part around his innovations. After his quartet disbanded, he formed a trio with David Izenzon on bass and Charles Moffett on drums. He extended the sound of his music, introducing string players and started playing trumpet and violin, which he taught himself to play left-handed. He had little conventional musical technique and used the instruments to make large, unrestrained gestures. His friendship with Albert Ayler influenced his development on trumpet and violin. Charlie Haden sometimes joined this trio to form a two-bass quartet.

Coleman signed with Blue Note and recorded At the Golden Circle Stockholm. In 1966, he recorded The Empty Foxhole with his son, Denardo Coleman, who was ten years old. Freddie Hubbard and Shelly Manne regarded this as an ill-advised piece of publicity on Coleman's part. Despite his youth, Denardo Coleman had studied drumming for several years. His technique was unrefined but enthusiastic, owing more to pulse-oriented free jazz drummers like Sunny Murray than to bebop drummers. He became his father's primary drummer in the late 1970s.

Coleman formed another quartet. Haden, Garrison, and Elvin Jones appeared, and Dewey Redman joined the group, usually on tenor saxophone. On February 29, 1968, in a group with Haden, Ed Blackwell, and David Izenzon Coleman performed live with Yoko Ono at Albert Hall. One song was included on the album Yoko Ono/Plastic Ono Band (1970).

He continued to explore his interest in string textures – from Town Hall, 1962, culminating with the Skies of America album in 1972. (Sometimes this had a practical value, as it facilitated his group's appearance in the UK in 1965, where jazz musicians were under a quota arrangement but classical performers were exempt.)

1970s–1990s: Harmolodic funk and Prime Time

Coleman, like Miles Davis before him, took to playing with electrified instruments. The 1976 funk album Dancing in Your Head, Coleman's first recording with the group which later became known as Prime Time, prominently featured electric guitars. While this marked a stylistic departure for Coleman, the music maintained certain similarities to his earlier work. These performances had the same angular melodies and simultaneous group improvisations – what Joe Zawinul referred to as "nobody solos, everybody solos" and what Coleman called harmolodics – and although the nature of the pulse was altered, Coleman's rhythmic approach was not.

In the 1980s, albums such as Virgin Beauty and Of Human Feelings continued to use rock and funk rhythms, sometimes called free funk. Jerry Garcia played guitar on three tracks from Coleman's 1988 album Virgin Beauty: "Three Wishes", "Singing in the Shower", and "Desert Players". Coleman joined the Grateful Dead on stage in 1993 during "Space" and stayed for "The Other One", "Stella Blue", Bobby Bland's "Turn on Your Lovelight", and the encore "Brokedown Palace". Another collaboration was with guitarist Pat Metheny, with whom Coleman recorded Song X (1985); though the album was released under Metheny's name, Coleman was essentially co-leader (contributing all the compositions).

In 1990, the city of Reggio Emilia in Italy held a three-day "Portrait of the Artist" featuring a Coleman quartet with Cherry, Haden, and Higgins. The festival also presented performances of his chamber music and the symphonic Skies of America. In 1991, Coleman played on the soundtrack for David Cronenberg's film Naked Lunch; the orchestra was conducted by Howard Shore. It is notable among other things for including a rare sighting of Coleman playing a jazz standard: Thelonious Monk's "Misterioso". Two 1972 (pre-electric) Coleman recordings, "Happy House" and "Foreigner in a Free Land", were used in Gus Van Sant's 2000 Finding Forrester. Coleman released four records in 1995 and 1996, and for the first time in many years worked regularly with piano players (either Geri Allen or Joachim Kühn).

2000s 
In September 2006 he released a live album titled Sound Grammar with his son, Denardo Coleman, and two bassists, Greg Cohen, and Tony Falanga. This was his first album of new material in ten years and was recorded in Germany in 2005. It won the 2007 Pulitzer Prize for music, Coleman being only the second jazz musician to win the prize. Although Wynton Marsalis won the Pulitzer Prize for Music in 1997 for Blood on the Fields, which is an oratorio on slavery, Sound Grammar is the first jazz album to win the award.

Jazz pianist Joanne Brackeen stated in an interview with Marian McPartland that Coleman mentored her and gave her music lessons.

Coleman married poet Jayne Cortez in 1954. The couple divorced in 1964. They had one son, Denardo, born in 1956.

Coleman died of a cardiac arrest at the age of 85 in New York City on June 11, 2015. His funeral was a three-hour event with performances and speeches by several of his collaborators and contemporaries.

Awards and honors 
 Down Beat Jazz Hall of Fame, 1969
 MacArthur Fellowship, 1994
 Praemium Imperiale, 2001
 Dorothy and Lillian Gish Prize, 2004
 Honorary doctorate of music, Berklee College of Music, 2006
 Grammy Lifetime Achievement Award, 2007
 Pulitzer Prize for music, 2007
 Miles Davis Award, Festival International de Jazz de Montréal, 2009
 Honorary doctorate by the Graduate Center, CUNY, 2008
 Honorary doctorate of music, University of Michigan, 2010

Discography

In popular culture
McClintic Sphere, a fictional character in Thomas Pynchon's debut novel V. (1963), is an innovative saxophonist modeled on Ornette Coleman.

Notes

References 
 Interview with Roy Eldridge, Esquire March 1961
 Interview with Andy Hamilton. "A Question of Scale" The Wire July 2005

External links 

 "Forms and Sounds" by Ethan Iverson about early Coleman and Harmolodics
 Interviewed by Michael Jarrett in Cadence magazine, October 1995
 "Ornette Coleman interview, 1996", LA Weekly
 New York Observer, December 19, 2005

1930 births
2015 deaths
20th-century American composers
20th-century American saxophonists
20th-century American violinists
21st-century American saxophonists
African-American saxophonists
Age controversies
American jazz saxophonists
American male saxophonists
American jazz violinists
American male violinists
Avant-garde jazz saxophonists
Free funk saxophonists
Free jazz saxophonists
Jazz alto saxophonists
ABC Records artists
Antilles Records artists
Atlantic Records artists
Blue Note Records artists
ESP-Disk artists
Grammy Lifetime Achievement Award winners
MacArthur Fellows
Pulitzer Prize for Music winners
Members of the American Academy of Arts and Letters
Recipients of the Praemium Imperiale
Musicians from Texas
Jazz musicians from Texas
People from Fort Worth, Texas
American male jazz musicians
Orchestra U.S.A. members
Black Lion Records artists
20th-century American male musicians
21st-century American male musicians
Prime Time (band) members
20th-century African-American musicians
21st-century African-American musicians